Ralph Davis is the name of:

 Ralph Davis (American football coach) (1920–2016), college football coach
 Ralph Davis (basketball) (1938–2021), American basketball player
 Ralph Davis (guard) (1922–1992), American football guard
 Ralph C. Davis (1894–1960), American professor of business organization
 R. H. C. Davis (Ralph Henry Carless Davis, 1918–1991), British historian
 Ralph Tipton Davis (1880–1934), American football player